The Iceland men's national under-18 ice hockey team is the men's national under-18 ice hockey team of Iceland. The team is controlled by Ice Hockey Iceland, a member of the International Ice Hockey Federation. The team represents Iceland at the IIHF World U18 Championships.

International competitions

IIHF World U18 Championships

1999: 7th in Division II Europe
2000: 9th in Division II Europe
2001: Did not qualify for Division III
2002: Did not participate
2003: 1st in Division III Group B
2004: 5th in Division II Group A
2005: 5th in Division II Group B
2006: 6th in Division II Group B
2007: 3rd in Division III
2008: 2nd in Division III Group B

2009: 1st in Division III Group B
2010: 6th in Division II Group A
2011: 1st in Division III Group B
2012: 4th in Division II Group B
2013: 5th in Division II Group B
2014: 6th in Division II Group B
2015: 1st in Division III Group A
2016: 4th in Division II Group B
2017: 5th in Division II Group B
2018: 6th in Division II Group B

External links
Iceland at IIHF.com

Ice hockey in Iceland
National under-18 ice hockey teams
Ice hockey